The Sisters  of St Louis (SSL) is a Roman Catholic religious order of nuns.  It traces its origins back to Juilly, France in 1842. It originally included men as well as women but subsequently became a women-only order. It is a relatively small order with a total of 450 members distributed across branches in Ireland, France, Belgium, United States and Africa.

Ireland

The mother house of the order in Ireland was founded in Monaghan in 1859. The second house followed in Bundoran in 1870. By papal decree, the Irish province became autonomous in 1921. It returned to the mother-congregation (in Juilly) in 1952.

The order was involved in the establishment of several schools.  These included 
 St. Louis Secondary School, Monaghan
 St Louis Secondary School, Carrickmacross, Co. Monaghan
 St. Louis Secondary School, Dundalk
 St Louis High School, Rathmines
 St Louis Grammar School, Ballymena
 St Louis Grammar School, Kilkeel
 St Louis Secondary School, Ramsgrange, Co. Wexford
 St Genevieve's High School, Belfast, Northern Ireland
 St Joseph’s Training School, MiddleTown, Northern Ireland
However, the order has since withdrawn from involvement in these schools.

Child sexual and physical abuse

The Northern Ireland Historical Institutional Abuse Inquiry investigated historical physical and sexual abuse of children at St Joseph's Training School, Middletown, N.I., run by the Sisters
of St Louis. There were many instances of physical abuse, and some of sexual abuse, but the inquiry did not find evidence of systemic sexual abuse.

Apology
On 11 March 2022 ministers from the five main political parties in Northern Ireland and six abusing institutions made statements of apology in the Northern Ireland Assembly. 

The six institutions that apologised for carrying out abuse were De La Salle Brothers, represented by Br Francis Manning; the Sisters of Nazareth, represented by Sr Cornelia Walsh; the Sisters of St Louis represented by Sr Uainin Clarke; the Good Shepherd Sisters, represented by Sr Cait O'Leary; Barnardo's in Northern Ireland, represented by Michele Janes; and Irish Church Missions, represented by Rev Mark Jones. In live reporting after the apology, BBC News reported that Jon McCourt from Survivors North West said "If what happened today was the best that the church could offer by way of an apology they failed miserably. There was no emotion, there was no ownership. ... I don't believe that the church and institutions atoned today." He called on the intuitions to "do the right thing" and contribute to the redress fund for survivors, saying that institutions have done similar for people in Scotland. McCourt praised the government ministers' apologies; they had "sat and thought out and listened to what it was we said.", but said that the institutions had failed to do this, leading to some victims having to leave the room while they were speaking, "compound[ing] the hurt." Others angry at the institutions' apologies included Caroline Farry, who attended St Joseph's Training School in Middletown from 1978-1981,  overseen by nuns from the Sisters of St Louis, Pádraigín Drinan from Survivors of Abuse, and Alice Harper, whose brother, a victim of the De La Salle Brothers, had since died. Peter Murdock, from campaign group Savia, was at Nazareth Lodge Orphanage with his brother (who had recently died); he likened the institution to an "SS camp". He said "It's shocking to hear a nun from the institution apologising ... it comes 30 years too late ... people need to realise that it has to come from the heart. They say it came from the heart but why did they not apologise 30 years ago?"

References

Catholic female orders and societies